Jackson's Arm is a town in the Canadian province of Newfoundland and Labrador, located on White Bay. It was settled by John Wicks of Christchurch, England, around 1870. The Post Office was established in 1892 and the first Postmistress was Belinda Peddle. The town had a population of 435 in 1956 and 277 as of the 2021 Canadian census. The primary industry of the town is fishing. In 2012, the local fish plant closed.

Demographics 

See also
 List of cities and towns in Newfoundland and Labrador
 Newfoundland outport

References

External links
 Jackson's Arm, Newfoundland and Labrador at Explore Newfoundland and Labrador

Towns in Newfoundland and Labrador
Populated places established in 1870
1870 establishments in the British Empire